René López (born 14 June 1963, date of death unknown) was a Salvadoran sprinter. He competed in the men's 400 metres at the 1984 Summer Olympics.

References

1963 births
Year of death missing
Athletes (track and field) at the 1984 Summer Olympics
Salvadoran male sprinters
Olympic athletes of El Salvador
Place of birth missing
Central American Games silver medalists for El Salvador
Central American Games medalists in athletics